The Hotel Le Plaza is a five-star luxury hotel in Brussels, Belgium. Built in an Art Deco style with Louis XVI interiors and opened to customers in 1930, it is one of the last independent hotels in Brussels, and also one of the oldest. It has 190 rooms and 14 spacious suites. It has served as a famous meeting place for great statesmen, artists and entertainers.

The hotel is located on the Boulevard Adolphe Max/Adolphe Maxlaan, not far from the Place de Brouckère/De Brouckèreplein and the Place Charles Rogier/Karel Rogierplein, as well as Brussels' busiest shopping street; the Rue Neuve/Nieuwstraat. This area is served by the metro and premetro (underground tram) stations De Brouckère (on lines 1, 3, 4 and 5) and Rogier (on lines 2, 3, 4 and 6).

History

Origins and early history
Under the reign of King Leopold II, following the covering of the river Senne (1867–1871), Brussels was remodelled with large boulevards and green avenues. The then-mayor of the City of Brussels, Jules Anspach, contributed to the transformation of the urban landscape of the capital by the realisation of thoroughfares from the North Station to the South Station, including from south to north and from west to east: the /, the Boulevard Anspach/Anspachlaan, the Boulevard Adolphe Max/Adolphe Maxlaan, and the /.

The Hotel Le Plaza opened its doors in 1930 on the Boulevard Adolphe Max. Soon after, prestigious guests came to stay there, and it became one of the symbols of Brussels' luxury hotel trade. In 1940, during the German occupation, the hotel was placed under the authority of the German troops and the military commander for Belgium and northern France took his quarters there. Premeditating its destruction, the Hotel Le Plaza was, exactly like the Palace of Justice, made into a booby-trap by the Germans, before the arrival of the Allied Forces. When it exploded, it killed two British Army officers: Captain George Hayton (age 32) and Major Anthony Wright (age 30), and destroyed the hotel's Winter Garden and sumptuous stained glass dome. Thankfully, the rest of the hotel was not damaged.

The song Indépendance Cha Cha was played for the first time in the hotel during the negotiations about Congolese independence from Belgium in 1960.

Closure, renovation and reopening
The Hotel Le Plaza was obliged, like many of its contemporaries, to close in 1976. Twenty years passed before the rebirth of the Hotel le Plaza under the impulse of its present owner, Baron van Gysel de Meise. With a view to restore the building's original purpose, while modernising its amenities, the Société de Gestion Hôtelière undertook, from February 1995, considerable renovation and furnishing works for an investment of 400 million Belgian francs. The restoration works were placed under the direction of the decorator Pierre-Yves Rochon—who was in particular in charge of the decoration of the Hôtel George-V in Paris⁠—and of Anne van Gysel.

Since 23 July 1992, the hotel has been listed as a protected monument by the Monuments and Sites Directorate of the Brussels-Capital Region.

Building
The architect of the Hotel Le Plaza, found inspiration in the style of the Hôtel George-V in Paris, ensuring by its concrete frame a remarkable solidity. The frontage was covered with French stones. The interior was designed to reflect the ideas of brightness and splendour: high ceilings, large corridors, large light rooms, several naturally lit bathrooms, majestic stairways covering eight floors, decorated with stained glass windows and fringed with wrought iron hand-rails.

Rooms
The Hotel Le Plaza offers 190 rooms and suites on seven floors: 109 classic rooms, 53 Deluxe rooms, 20 Prestige rooms, 4 Executive suites, 1 Plaza suite and 1 Presidential suite, which is one of the biggest in the Benelux. The suites, with high ceilings, are situated along large and spacious corridors.

Theatre
It was built in 1930, in a unique Spanish–Arab–Moorish style. Under the name of Acropole Cinema, it opened in 1928 and had an interior designed in a Spanish style with many false windows and barley sugar columns. Seating was provided in stalls and balcony. At one time (possibly in the 1930s), it ran cine-variety shows.

The entrance to the cinema was located at the left-hand side of the twin-blocked building and originally had a large vertical PLAZA sign over the entrance. There was a Plaza Taverne located on the corner of the Boulevard Adolphe Max and the narrow /, now the main entrance to the hotel. The rear of the building backs onto the former Variétiés theatre (Cinerama) around the corner on the Rue de Malines.

The decision was taken during the renovation to keep the original boxes, the genuine bracket-lamps, the stage, as well as the richly sculpted wall ornaments of Andalusian inspiration. It is nowadays used as a banquet hall and conference facility.

L'Estérel restaurant
The restaurant features the particularity of combining a bar and a restaurant for 48 guests. The decoration of the restaurant is very luxurious like the hotel. The particularity of this decoration is the painted ceiling of the restaurant, picturing a mainly blue sky. The menu, created by the chef Olivier Bontemps and his sous-chef Alexandre Van Kalck, varies with the seasons to guarantee fresh quality ingredients.

Movies filmed at the Hotel
The Hotel Le Plaza has been the set of many films in recent years. Examples include:
 2010: Hotel Swooni, directed by Kaat Beels
 2010: Moi, Michel G., milliardaire, maître du monde, with François-Xavier Demaison, Laurent Lafitte, directed by Stéphane Kazandjian
 2012: Ushi must Marry, directed by Raul Ruven
 2012: Möbius, directed by Éric Rochant, with Jean Dujardin and Cécile de France

Famous guests
Shortly after the liberation of Brussels on 4 September 1944, the British General Staff occupied the Hotel Le Plaza. In addition, Sir Winston Churchill and Joseph Luns, Secretary-General of NATO from 1971 to 1984, stayed there regularly. Other important personalities of politics and finance were regular guests of the prestigious hotel, but it was most appreciated by the world of the arts and show business: Charles Aznavour, Jean Marais, Maurice Chevalier, Mistinguett, Louis Jouvet, Michèle Morgan, Gérard Philippe, Annie Cordy, Simone Signoret and Yves Montand, Luis Mariano, Gary Cooper, Raymond Devos, Georges Guétary, Josephine Baker, Fernandel, Lucienne Boyer, Charles Trenet, Martine Carol, Bourvil, Brigitte Bardot, Jean-Claude Pascal, and Claudine Dupuis.

See also
 Corinthia Grand Hotel Astoria
 Hotel Métropole, Brussels
 Art Deco in Brussels
 History of Brussels
 Belgium in "the long nineteenth century"

References

Notes

Bibliography
 
 L'institut dentaire George Eastman Bruxelles et quelques autres réalisations de l'architecte Michel Polak (in French), Edition d'art et de publicité "Mundus" s.a., Brussels, 1937

External links

 Hotel Le Plaza Official
 Pierres Yves Rochon Official
 Official website of tourism and convention of Brussels
 Cinema Pleasures website

Le Plaza
City of Brussels
Buildings and structures in Brussels
Protected heritage sites in Brussels
Hotels established in 1931
Hotel buildings completed in 1931
Heritage hotels